= Irina oil field =

Black Sea oil field

Irina
- Country: Romania
- Region: Black Sea
- Block: Pelican
- Offshore/onshore: offshore
- Operator: Sterling Resources

Field history
- Discovery: 2010
- Start of development: 2014
- Start of production: 2015

Production
- Current production of oil: 3,000 barrels per day (~1.5×10^{5} t/a)
- Estimated oil in place: 9.6 million tonnes (~ 11×10^{6} m^{3} or 68 million bbl)

The Irina oil field is an oil field located on the continental shelf of the Black Sea. It was discovered in 2010 and developed by Sterling Resources. It will begin production in 2015 and will produce oil. The total proven reserves of the Irina oil field are around 68 million barrels (9.6 million tonnes), and production is centered on 3,000 barrels per day (480 m^{3}/d).
